Crystal Methyd (born 16 April 1991) is the stage name of Cody D. Harness, an American drag performer who competed on the twelfth season of RuPaul's Drag Race. Her name refers to crystal meth.

Early life and education
Harness was born on April 16th, 1991, in San Jose, California, to a Mexican mother and American father. At age 5, Harness's family moved to Springfield, Missouri to be closer to his dad’s parents, and is where he became an Eagle Scout. He graduated from Missouri State University, and first performed in drag at Springfield PrideFest in 2015. He has recalled, "I was practicing my makeup in my room for about a month before I performed. I had a lot of fun, and people told me I looked different, and I liked that."

Career
Crystal Methyd launched the monthly drag show "Get Dusted" at Springfield, Missouri's Outland Ballroom, and partnered with a local restaurant owner to host the city's first drag brunch in 2017. In addition to hosting "Get Dusted", which Bernardo Sim of Screen Rant said "has reenergized the drag scene in Springfield" and features "drag performers of all gender expressions and sexual orientations ... including straight cis men", Crystal helped performers with their makeup.

In 2020, Crystal Methyd competed on the twelfth season of RuPaul's Drag Race. Bustle Kayla Blanton called her the "dark horse of the season", and MTV's Christopher Rudolph named her the "kookiest" of the contestants. Daniel Reynolds of The Advocate said she had a "kooky charm" and described her lip sync to Nelly Furtado's "I'm Like a Bird" during the finale as "unforgettable". The Houston Chronicle Joey Guerra wrote, "The kooky queen with a mullet was a sharp contrast to much of her Season 12 competition. She struggled at first, unsure of how to fit her persona into the show's mechanics. But when she stopped trying, she soared and learned to shape each challenge to fit her." Michael Cook of South Florida Gay News said "her now-iconic runway looks were nothing to laugh at; this queen is one of a kind". Her parents and Spanish-speaking grandmother appeared on the finale. Jaida Essence Hall won season 12, with Crystal Methyd and Gigi Goode as the runners-up.

In September 2021, Methyd embarked on "Crystal & Jujubee's Wonderland Euro Tour," her first international tour with fellow drag race alum Jujubee, performing in 7 different cities across Europe.

Personal life
Harness lives in Springfield, Missouri, as of 2020. He has a tattoo of "One Direction" in Arabic on his chest. She is the drag mother of RuPaul's Drag Race season 14 contestant, Daya Betty.

Filmography

Television

Music videos

Web series

Discography

Featured singles

See also
 List of Eagle Scouts
 List of Missouri State University alumni

References

External links

 
 

Living people
American people of Mexican descent
Hispanic and Latino American drag queens
LGBT culture in Missouri
Missouri State University alumni
People from San Jose, California
People from Springfield, Missouri
Crystal Methyd
1991 births